"All Cried Out" is the debut single from American recording artist and American Idol season 12 runner-up, Kree Harrison. The song was co-written by Katrina Elam, Steve McEwan and Gordie Sampson.

Harrison first performed the song, her potential coronation song had she won the title, on the season's final performance night on May 15, 2013. Her recording of "All Cried Out" was released as a single on May 16, 2013.

Critical reception
Billy Dukes of Taste of Country gave the song two and a half stars out of five, writing that "the ballad is a showcase for her vocal range and power, but it’s never made clear why the Texan is so bummed." Matt Bjorke of Roughstock gave the song a favorable review, saying that Harrison "has hints of Martina McBride and Carrie Underwood in her phrasing and vocal runs" and "should be able to compete with any and all of the top stars of the mainstream country music format."

Track listing

Chart performance
The song sold 24,000 copies in its debut week, and it reached No. 34 in the Hot Country Songs chart and No. 85 in the Hot Digital Songs chart.  It reached No.22 on the Country Digital songs, but dropped out of Top 50 the next week with 9,188 copies sold totaling 33,513 sold in 2 weeks.

Release history

References

2013 debut singles
American Idol songs
Country ballads
Kree Harrison songs
Songs written by Katrina Elam
Songs written by Steve McEwan
Songs written by Gordie Sampson
2013 songs
19 Recordings singles